The 1937–38 season was Mansfield Town's seventh season in the Football League and Second in the Third Division South, they finished in 14th position with 39 points.

Final league table

Results

Football League Third Division South

FA Cup

Football League Third Division South Cup

Squad statistics
 Squad list sourced from

References
General
 Mansfield Town 1937–38 at soccerbase.com (use drop down list to select relevant season)

Specific

Mansfield Town F.C. seasons
Mansfield Town